Palanpur State was a princely state of India during the British Raj. It was a Salute state with the Nawab of Palanpur having a hereditary salute of 13-guns. It was the main state of the Palanpur Agency. Palanpur State became a British protectorate in 1809/17; its capital was the city of Palanpur.

Geography

The town of Palanpur housed a population of only 17,800 people that year. The state commanded a revenue of approximately £50,000 per year.

Palanpur State was traversed by the main line of the Rajputana-Malwa Railway, and contained the British cantonment of Deesa. Wheat, rice and sugar-cane were the chief products. Watered by the Saraswati river, the state was heavily forested in its northern end (the present-day Jessore Sanctuary) but undulating and open in the south and east. The country was on the whole somewhat hilly, being at the edge of the Aravalli Range. In 1940 Palanpur State had a population of 3,15,855.

History

According to tradition Palanpur state was founded in 1370 and was ruled by the pashtun tribe of Lohani (Hetani, Bihari Pathan) of Jhalori dynasty. Malik Khurram Khan Vihari (Bihari), the founder of the Palanpur house, left Bihar and entered the service of Vishaldev of Mandore during the late fourteenth century. Appointed Governor of Songad or Jhalor, he took control of that place in the confusion that followed the death of the Mandore ruler'; a forebear of the family is reputed to have wed the foster-sister of the Mughal emperor Akbar and received Palanpur and surrounding areas as dowry. However, the family comes into historical prominence during the period of instability that followed the demise of Aurangzeb in the early 18th century. It was overrun soon afterwards by the Marathas; the Lohanis followed the trend of seeking recourse in the British East India Company against them and finally entered the subsidiary alliance system in 1817, along with all other neighbouring states, becoming a British protectorate.

Palanpur State was dissolved in 1949.

Rulers

The rulers of Palanpur State belonged to the Lohani tribe (Hetani, Bihari Pathan) of Jalori dynasty. All rulers used the title of Diwan except the last two rulers who used the title of Nawab.

Diwans

       1688 -        1704  Firuz Kamal Khan (2nd time)
       1704 -        1708  Kamal Khan                         (b. 16... - d. 1708)
       1708 -        1719  Firuz Khan II                      (b. ... - d. 1719)
       1719 -        1732  Karim Dad Khan                     (b. ... - d. 1732)
       1732 -        1743  Pahar Khan II                      (b. ... - d. 1743)
       1743 -        1768  Bahadur Khan                       (b. ... - d. 1768)
       1768 -        1781  Salim Khan I                       (b. ... - d. 1781)
       1781 -        1788  Shir Khan                          (b. ... - d. 1788)
       1788 -        1793  Mubariz Khan II
       1793 -        1794  Shamshir Khan
       1794 -        1812  Firuz Khan III                     (b. 17... - d. 1812)
       1812 -        1813  Fateh Mohammad Khan (1st time)     (b. 1799 - d. 1854)
       1813 - 22 Dec 1813  Shamshir Mohammad Khan             (b. ... - d. 1834) (then regent for successor to 10 Oct 1817)
22 Dec 1813 – 11 Jul 1854  Fateh Mohammad Khan (2nd time)     (s.a.)
11 Jul 1854 – 28 Aug 1878  Zorawar Khan                       (b. 1822 - d. 1878)
28 Aug 1878 -        1910  Zobdat al-Molk Shir Mohammad Khan  (b. 1852 - d. 1918)

Nawab Sahibs

1910 - 28 Sep 1918  Zobdat al-Molk Shir Mohammad Khan  (s.a.)
28 Sep 1918 – 15 Aug 1947  Zobdat al-Molk Taley Mohammad Khan (b. 1883 - d. 1957)

See also

 Pathans of Gujarat
 History of Palanpur
 Joan Falkiner

References

External links

Heraldry of the princely states of Gujarat

Princely states of Gujarat
Pashtun dynasties
Banaskantha district
Bombay Presidency
Muslim princely states of India
14th-century establishments in India
1370s establishments in Asia
1948 disestablishments in India